The 2nd season of Gwiazdy tańczą na lodzie, the Polish edition of Dancing on Ice, started on March 7, 2008 and ended on May 23, 2008. It was broadcast by TVP2. Tatiana Okupnik and Maciej Kurzajewski as the hosts, and the judges were: Dorota Rabczewska, Włodzimierz Szaranowicz, Maria Zuchowicz and Igor Kryszyłowicz.

Couples

Scores

Red numbers indicate the lowest score for each week.
Green numbers indicate the highest score for each week.
 indicates the couple eliminated that week.
 indicates the returning couple that finished in the bottom two (Skate Off).
 indicates the winning couple of the week.
 indicates the runner-up of the week.

Average Chart

The Best Score (10.0)

Episodes

Week 1 – Present Hits
Individual judges scores in charts below (given in parentheses) are listed in this order from left to right: Włodzimierz Szaranowicz, Dorota Rabczewska, Igor Kryszyłowicz, Maria Zuchowicz.

Running order

Skate OFF
Running order

Week 2 – Movie Music
Individual judges scores in charts below (given in parentheses) are listed in this order from left to right: Włodzimierz Szaranowicz, Dorota Rabczewska, Igor Kryszyłowicz, Maria Zuchowicz.

Running order

Skate OFF
Running order

Week 3 – Love Songs
Individual judges scores in charts below (given in parentheses) are listed in this order from left to right: Włodzimierz Szaranowicz, Dorota Rabczewska, Igor Kryszyłowicz, Maria Zuchowicz.Running orderSkate OFFRunning order

Week 4 – Disco Songs
Individual judges scores in charts below (given in parentheses) are listed in this order from left to right: Włodzimierz Szaranowicz, Igor Kryszyłowicz, Rafał Mroczek, Maria Zuchowicz.Running orderSkate OFFRunning order

Week 5 – Hip Hop Songs & R'n'B Songs
Individual judges scores in charts below (given in parentheses) are listed in this order from left to right: Włodzimierz Szaranowicz, Dorota Rabczewska, Igor Kryszyłowicz, Maria Zuchowicz.

Running orderSkate OFF'''
Running order

Week 6 – 20's & 30'sIndividual judges scores in charts below (given in parentheses) are listed in this order from left to right: Włodzimierz Szaranowicz, Dorota Rabczewska, Igor Kryszyłowicz, Maria Zuchowicz.

Running order

Skate OFF
Running order

Week 7 – Pop Songs & Sweet 16Individual judges scores in charts below (given in parentheses) are listed in this order from left to right: Włodzimierz Szaranowicz, Dorota Rabczewska, Igor Kryszyłowicz, Maria Zuchowicz.Running order

Skate OFF
Running order

Week 8 – Classic Songs & Vacation SongsIndividual judges scores in charts below (given in parentheses) are listed in this order from left to right: Włodzimierz Szaranowicz, Dorota Rabczewska, Igor Kryszyłowicz, Maria Zuchowicz.Running order

Skate OFF
Running order

Week 9 – Classic Rock & MusicalsIndividual judges scores in charts below (given in parentheses) are listed in this order from left to right: Włodzimierz Szaranowicz, Dorota Rabczewska, Igor Kryszyłowicz, Maria Zuchowicz.Running order

Skate OFF
Running order

Week 10 – Aria & Jazz, SwingIndividual judges scores in charts below (given in parentheses) are listed in this order from left to right: Włodzimierz Szaranowicz, Dorota Rabczewska, Igor Kryszyłowicz, Maria Zuchowicz.''

Running order

Skate OFF
Running order

Week 11 – Popular Duet & The Best Dance

Running order

Episode results

Rating Figures

2
2008 Polish television seasons